is a 1999 Japanese romantic comedy film directed by Kentarō Ōtani and starring Yuka Itaya, Hirofumi Kobayashi and Kaori Tsuji. It was released on 6 March 1999.

Cast
Yuka Itaya
Hirofumi Kobayashi
Kaori Tsuji
Ren Ōsugi
Gō Inoue
Mayumi Terashima

Reception
It was chosen as the 9th best film at the 21st Yokohama Film Festival.

References

External links

1999 romantic comedy films
1999 films
Films directed by Kentarō Ōtani
Japanese romantic comedy films
1990s Japanese films